The Agnew Lake Mine was a uranium mine located in the township of Hyman approximately  northeast of Agnew Lake, Ontario and  east of Elliot Lake, Ontario.

History

90 holes were diamond drilled by New Thurbois Mines Limited in 1954 to 1955. In 1956, Canadian Thorium Corporation Limited purchased the site and completed ground geophysics and mapping. Kerr Addison Mines Limited and Quebec Mattagami Minerals continued to develop the site in 1965 to 1967. Agnew Lake Mines Limited bought the property in 1967 and continued the property development, and started mining. The mine began producing uranium in 1977, utilizing both underground and surface mining techniques. Agnew Lake was the first biohydrometallurgy  mining operation. Underground mining was done via sublevel stoping, with oversize rock skipped to surface via a shaft, bioleaching was carried out both underground and on surface stockpiles to produce Triuranium octoxide (U3O8). By the end of 1980 underground mining stopped, and by 1983 the mine closed.

The Agnew Lake mine site was decommissioned, buildings removed, and the shaft capped.  Monitoring of the site was carried out by Kerr Addison between 1983 and 1988, with the property being turned over to the Ontario government in the early 1990s.

In 2005 and 2006 472m of diamond drilling was completed by Ursa Major Minerals Incorporated. Nyah Resources Incorporated did seven more diamond drill holes in 2007. In 2017, Skead Holdings Incorporated did a ground geophysical survey.

Geology

The uranium mineralization at Agnew Lake is contained within a pyritic quartz-pebble conglomerate that unconformably overlies granitic rocks.  This is similar to the style of mineralization found in the Elliot Lake uranium camp.

See also

Quartz-pebble conglomerate deposits
Uranium mining
List of uranium mines
List of mines in Ontario

References

External links 

Agnew Lake Uranium Mine
Agnew Lake Mine, Sudbury, Ontario, Canada
Mineral Deposit Inventory for Ontario - Deposit: MDI41I05NE00009
Minedat.org - Agnew Lake Mine
Uranium and Thorium Deposits of Northern Ontario (pg 106)
Agnew Lake Uranium Mine - still a good uranium prospect

Surface mines in Canada
Underground mines in Canada
Mines in Elliot Lake
Former mines in Ontario
Uranium mines in Ontario
1977 establishments in Ontario
1983 disestablishments in Ontario